Association de la Jeunesse Sportive de Mutsamudu is a Comorian football club located in Mutsamudu, Comoros.  It currently plays in the Comoros Premier League.

In 2006–2007 the team has won the Comoros Premier League.

Honours
Comoros Premier League: 1
2006-2007

Stadium
Currently the team plays at the 1000 capacity Stade Hombo.

References

External links
Team profile – soccerway.com

Football clubs in the Comoros